This is a complete list of towns in the Commonwealth of Virginia in the United States.  An incorporated town in Virginia is the equivalent of a city in most other states, i.e. a municipality which is part of a county.  Incorporated cities in Virginia are independent jurisdictions and separate from any county.
, there are 190 incorporated towns and 228 municipalities, some of which are more populous than many independent cities, but are not incorporated as cities and are therefore situated within a parent county or counties.

New towns may be incorporated but must have a minimum population of 1,000 residents.  Cities with populations of less than 50,000 are eligible to become towns through reversion.  The newest town and newest former town are Bedford in Bedford County, which ceased to be an independent city in 2013, and Columbia in Fluvanna County, which disincorporated in 2016. For a complete list of independent cities, see List of cities in Virginia.  For major unincorporated population centers, see List of unincorporated communities in Virginia.

Complete list
Population figures reflect the Census Bureau's official 2020 population census, and geographic coordinates are derived from 2016 Census Bureau figures.

Note
The towns of Castlewood (Russell County), Clover (Halifax County), and Columbia (Fluvanna County) were disincorporated in 1997, 1998, and 2016 respectively.

References

External links
List of Counties with Towns and Adjacent Cities
Functions of Counties, Cities and Towns
Virginia Commission on Local Government

Towns
 
Virginia